{{Taxobox
| image =
| image_caption =
| regnum = Fungi
| phylum = Ascomycota
| classis = Eurotiomycetes
| ordo = Onygenales
| familia = Nannizziopsidaceae
| genus = Nannizziopsis
| genus_authority = Currah
| type_species = Nannizziopsis vriesii
| type_species_authority = (Apinis) Currah
| subdivision_ranks = Species
| subdivision = Nannizziopsis arthrosporioides
Nannizziopsis barbataNannizziopsis chlamydospora
Nannizziopsis crocodili
Nannizziopsis dermatitidis
Nannizziopsis draconii
Nannizziopsis guarroi
Nannizziopsis hominis
Nannizziopsis infrequens
Nannizziopsis obscura
Nannizziopsis pluriseptata
Nannizziopsis vriesii
}}Nannizziopsis''' is a genus of fungi within the Nannizziopsidaceae family. It was once within the Onygenaceae family, before being moved.

References

External linksNannizziopsis'' at Index Fungorum

Onygenales
Eurotiomycetes genera